The Satsalla River is a river in the Pacific Ranges of the Coast Mountains in British Columbia, Canada, flowing southwest into the Kingcome River.  Like the Atlatzi River, another major tributary of the Kingcome farther south, its origins are on the edge of the Ha-Iltzuk Icefield.

See also
List of British Columbia rivers

References

Rivers of the Central Coast of British Columbia
Rivers of the Pacific Ranges